Kirsten Benkendorff is a marine scientist who works on molluscs, antibiotics, anti-inflammatory properties and cancer fighting properties. She was awarded Young Australian of the Year in 2000 and a Dorothy Hill Medal for Science in 2011.

Early life and career 
Benkendorff obtained a Bachelor of Science from Macquarie University in 1994, followed by a PhD at the University of Wollongong in 1999. She was a career consultant for the Shellharbour Council in New South Wales, before becoming a lecturer in Marine Biology at Flinders University in South Australia, from 2006 to 2010, and then working at Southern Cross University.

Benkendorff has conducted research on a combination of medical and marine research, investigating the anti-cancer extracts from the Australian marine life including the whelk.

Benkendorff is a Professor of Marine Science, and the Co-Deputy Director of the Marine Ecology Research Centre at Southern Cross University. She is also a Councillor, within the Malacological Society of Australasia as well as an Associate Editor Scientific Reports and Marine Drugs.

In 2011 she was awarded the Dorothy Hill Medal for her research on marine science, molluscs and their medicinal properties. She was awarded the Young Australian of the Year, in 2000, for Science and Technology and NSW Australian of the year, in 2001, for her contributions to the environment.

Benkendorff has research projects on studying the effects of pesticides on both prawns and oysters. She also has a research project on the anti-oxidant and anti-inflammatory properties within marine mollusc extracts. She has a research project investigating the influence of ocean climate change stressors on the quality of seafood and marine invertebrates and their lipid profiles.

Publications 

Select examples of Benkendorff's publications are as follows:

 Chemical defense in the egg masses of benthic invertebrates: an assessment of antibacterial activity in 39 mollusks and 4 polychaetes. (2001) K Benkendorff, AR Davis, JB Bremner. Journal of invertebrate pathology 78 (2), 109-118.
 Free fatty acids and sterols in the benthic spawn of aquatic molluscs, and their associated antimicrobial properties. (2005) K Benkendorff, AR Davis, CN Rogers, JB Bremner. Journal of Experimental Marine Biology and Ecology 316 (1), 29-44.
 Molluscan biological and chemical diversity: secondary metabolites and medicinal resources produced by marine molluscs. (2010). K Benkendorff. Biological Reviews 85 (4), 757-775.

Prizes and awards

Media
Benkendorff has published in The Sydney Morning Herald, and The Conversation, on her research into the cancer fighting properties of molluscs.

References

Australian women academics
Australian women scientists
Living people
Macquarie University alumni
University of Wollongong alumni
1973 births